Sir Solomon Hochoy  (20 April 1905 – 15 November 1983) was the last colonial governor of Trinidad and Tobago and the first governor-general upon the country's independence in 1962. He was the first non-European governor of a British crown colony and the first ethnically Han Chinese and nationally Caribbean person to become Governor-General in the Commonwealth.

Life and career

Of Hakka Han Chinese descent, Hochoy's family emigrated to Trinidad when he was two years old. He spent his early years in Blanchisseuse. After rising through the civil service, Hochoy was appointed the first non-European Governor in the entire British Empire in 1960, and the first ethnic Chinese to be Governor.

When Trinidad and Tobago became independent in 1962 Hochoy was appointed Governor General. He retired from that position in 1972 and was succeeded by Ellis Clarke. After retirement he returned to Blanchisseuse where he spent the remainder of his life.

Family

He was married to Thelma Huggins, a social activist.

Legacy

The Sir Solomon Hochoy Highway and the Solomon Hochoy Trophy (for football) are named in his honour.

References

External links
 

1905 births
1983 deaths
Knights Grand Cross of the Order of St Michael and St George
Governors-General of Trinidad and Tobago
Governors of Trinidad and Tobago
Trinidad and Tobago knights
Trinidad and Tobago people of Chinese descent
Knights Grand Cross of the Royal Victorian Order
Officers of the Order of the British Empire
Recipients of the Trinity Cross
People from Tunapuna–Piarco
Trinidad and Tobago politicians of Chinese descent
Jamaican emigrants to Trinidad and Tobago